Vince Guaraldi and the Lost Cues from the Charlie Brown Television Specials is a compilation soundtrack album by Vince Guaraldi released by D & D Records (Guaraldi’s label) in 2007. The album consists of select music cues featured on several Peanuts television specials produced between 1972 and 1975.

Background
In the mid-2000s, recording studio master tapes for seven 1970s-era Peanuts television specials scored by Vince Guaraldi were discovered by his son, Dave Guaraldi. Dave chose a handful of the better individual songs to compile what would be the first of two volumes containing unreleased music cues.

Dave Guaraldi then worked to restore the master tapes with audio archivist Michael Graves at his Atlanta, Georgia-based Osiris Studio.

The songs chosen for this volume were featured in the following Peanuts television specials:
 You're Not Elected, Charlie Brown (1972)
 There's No Time for Love, Charlie Brown (1973)
 A Charlie Brown Thanksgiving (1973)
 It's a Mystery, Charlie Brown (1974)
 You're a Good Sport, Charlie Brown (1975)

Reception and notability
Sound Insights author Doug Payne noted that the release of Vince Guaraldi and the Lost Cues from the Charlie Brown Television Specials was notable due to the fact that almost none of Guaraldi's Peanuts soundtrack work was made available for public consumption. Despite scoring 16 Peanuts television specials and one feature film, only two official soundtracks were released during Guaraldi's lifetime: Jazz Impressions of A Boy Named Charlie Brown (an unaired television documentary) and A Charlie Brown Christmas. Vince Guaraldi and the Lost Cues from the Charlie Brown Television Specials did much to fill a significant gap in this respect.

Chris Holmes of the nostalgia-themed website grayflannelsuit.net commented that "although some songs are quite brief, they paint a good picture of Guaraldi’s music near the end of his life; whimsical, funky, and always impeccably performed."

T. Ballard Lesemann of the Charleston City Paper called "Little Birdie" the "best Thanksgiving theme," commenting the "anti-worry/positive sentiment and snuffy singing style somehow matches the vibe of the season. Guaraldi sings lead, just barely in front of a great-sounding brass section and some funky electric piano."

Track listing
All songs composed by Vince Guaraldi.

Liner notes erroneously state that "Peppermint Patty" (Track 5) was featured in A Charlie Brown Thanksgiving; this version did not appear in any Peanuts television special.
The vocal version of "Joe Cool" (Track 10) is a composite of three separate recordings from different specials.

Personnel
All songs recorded at Wally Heider Studios, San Francisco, California.

You're Not Elected, Charlie Brown – Vince Guaraldi Quintet
Recorded on August 22, 1972
Vince Guaraldi – acoustic piano, electric keyboards, guitars, vocals
Seward McCain – electric bass
Tom Harrell – trumpet
Pat O'Hara – flute
Glenn Cronkhite – drums

There's No Time for Love, Charlie Brown – Vince Guaraldi Quintet
Recorded on January 15, February 22 and 26, 1973
Vince Guaraldi – acoustic piano, electric keyboards, guitars, vocals
Seward McCain – electric bass
Tom Harrell – trumpet
Pat O'Hara – flute
Glenn Cronkhite – drums

A Charlie Brown Thanksgiving – Vince Guaraldi Quintet
Recorded on July 17-18, August 6 and October 1, 1973
Vince Guaraldi – acoustic piano, electric keyboards, vocals, guitars
Seward McCain – electric bass
Tom Harrell – trumpet
Chuck Bennett – trombone
Mike Clark – drums

It's a Mystery, Charlie Brown – Vince Guaraldi Quartet
Recorded on January 5, 11, 23 and 30, 1974
Vince Guaraldi – acoustic piano, electric keyboards, guitars
Seward McCain – electric bass
Tom Harrell – trumpet
Eliot Zigmund – drums (January 11)
Mike Clark – drums (all other dates)

You're a Good Sport, Charlie Brown – Vince Guaraldi Trio
Recorded on September 12 and 24, 1975
Vince Guaraldi – acoustic piano, electric keyboards, Minimoog/ARP String Ensemble synthesizers
Seward McCain – electric bass
Mark Rosengarden – drums

References

External links
 

2007 soundtrack albums
Albums arranged by Vince Guaraldi
Vince Guaraldi soundtracks
Vince Guaraldi albums
Cool jazz soundtracks
Mainstream jazz soundtracks
Peanuts music
Television animation soundtracks